is a Japanese film directed by Shūsuke Kaneko. The film gives a description of the life of students struggling to find a job at the end of college in Japan at the end of the 1980s, a time when companies would fight to get the best students to join their ranks. The title would be best translated into English as "All Quiet on the Recruit Front", as it is a pun on the Japanese title of the book by Erich Maria Remarque (Seibu sensen ijo nashi). Actress Emi Wakui won the Best Supporting Actress prizes at the Japan Academy Awards and the Yokohama Film Festival for her role in this film.

References

Sources
 

  
 

1991 films
1990s Japanese-language films
Films directed by Shusuke Kaneko
Films scored by Kow Otani
1990s Japanese films